Sprunger is a surname. Notable people with the surname include:

Ellen Sprunger (born 1986), Swiss heptathlete
Julien Sprunger (born 1986), Swiss ice hockey player
Léa Sprunger (born 1990), Swiss heptathlete turned sprinter, sister of Ellen
Michel Sprunger (born 1985), Swiss footballer

See also
Springer (surname)